Mali Podlog is a settlement in the Municipality of Krško in eastern Slovenia. It lies just south of the A2 motorway from Ljubljana to Zagreb. The area is part of the traditional region of Lower Carniola. It is now included with the rest of the municipality in the Lower Sava Statistical Region.

There is a small chapel-shrine in the settlement dedicated to the Virgin Mary. It was built in the early 20th century.

References

External links
Mali Podlog on Geopedia

Populated places in the Municipality of Krško